Walangama is an extinct Paman language of the Cape York Peninsula, Queensland. It may have been one of the Southern Paman languages, but is poorly attested.

References 

Southern Pama languages
Extinct languages of Queensland